Catholic Extension (also known as the Catholic Church Extension Society) is a national fundraising 501(c)(3) organization which supports and strengthens poor mission dioceses across the United States. They provide funding and resources to dioceses and parishes through programs and services investing in people, infrastructure and ministries. This support is given based on need, passion and commitment to the growth of the Catholic faith.

History
Father Francis Kelley, a priest from Lapeer, Michigan, first envisioned Catholic Extension in 1904. Through his travels, he discovered places and communities that were struggling to keep the Catholic faith alive and growing. The Archbishop of Chicago, James Edward Quigley, agreed to help Father Kelley launch this new organization. As a result, the Catholic Church Extension Society was organized on October 18, 1905. Temporary headquarters were established in Lapeer, Michigan, where a charter was granted to the society by the state of Michigan on December 25, 1905.

In January 1907, society headquarters were moved to Chicago, and the president was transferred to that archdiocese. On June 7, 1907, Catholic Extension received its first papal approval by an Apostolic Letter of Pope Pius X addressed to the Archbishop of Chicago. Almost exactly three years later, on June 9, 1910, the Pope issued a brief by which the society was raised to the dignity of a canonical institution directly under his own guidance and protection. By the terms of this brief, the Archbishop of Chicago will always remain chancellor of the Society, and the president must be appointed by the Pope himself. The President's term of office is not more than five years. The board of governors has the right to propose three names to the Holy See for this office, and to elect, according to their laws, all other officers of the society.

Mission dioceses generally are rural, cover a large geographic area, and have limited personnel and pastoral resources. Since 1905, the society has given more than $500 million to 94 mission dioceses across the country. Extension has been active in Puerto Rico for over 100 years, funding about 1,400 building projects.

Present day
In 2012, Catholic Extension approved a $56,000 two year grant to the Archdiocese for the Military Services to support a faith formation program for Catholics in the United States military. In 2018, Catholic Extension launched a Mission Immersion Program for pastors from various parts of the country, which allows them to experience circumstances pastors in poor areas of the country face. Large-scale raids conducted in August 2019 by U.S. Immigration and Customs Enforcement resulted in the arrest of 680 people at various food processing plants in the state of Mississippi. Extension set up "The Holy Family" fund to financially assist families without their main breadwinner because of detention or deportation. The fund will be managed by the Roman Catholic Diocese of Jackson.

Leadership
 Chancellor – Blase J. Cupich, Archbishop of Chicago
 Vice Chancellor – Gerald F. Kicanas, Bishop of Tucson
 President – John J. Wall

Past presidents
Francis Clement Kelley – Founder, President 1905–1924
William D. O'Brien – President 1925–1962
Joseph B. Lux – President 1962–1966
Kenneth G. Stack – President 1966–1968
John L. May – President 1968–1970
Joseph A. Cusack – President 1970–1976
Edward J. Slattery – President 1977–1994
Kenneth J. Velo – President 1994–2001
William R. Houck – President 2001–2007

Extension Magazine
In April 1906, the society began the publication of a quarterly bulletin called Extension. In May 1907, this quarterly was enlarged and changed into a monthly bulletin. Kelley served as the original writer, editor and publisher. Since then, Extension has developed to include a collection of articles illustrating the history of the Catholic Church in America. Now a quarterly publication.

Lumen Christi Award
Every year, Catholic Extension's Lumen Christi Award honors an individual or group working in one of America's mission dioceses who demonstrates how the power of faith can transform lives and communities. The $1,000 award is accompanied by a $50,000 grant: $25,000 for the honoree and $25,000 for his or her nominating diocese. In 2018, the Lumen Christi was awarded to Sister Marie-Paule Willem, a Franciscan Missionary of Mary, serving in the Diocese of Las Cruces, New Mexico, honored a lifetime of missionary work.

References

Attribution

External links
Catholic Church Extension Society (USA)

Christian organizations established in 1905
1905 establishments in Michigan
Catholic charities
Charities based in Illinois